New Mexico is a state in the southwestern United States, the term also refers to the historical Nuevo México in New Spain and Mexico, as well as the former New Mexico Territory and the U.S. provisional government of New Mexico which preceded it in the American frontier.

New Mexico may also refer to:

Places

Mexico
Nuevo México, Chiapas; see Villaflores, Chiapas
Nuevo México, Jalisco

United States
Mexico, Illinois, formerly New Mexico, Illinois
New Mexico, Maryland, an unincorporated community in Carroll County

Elsewhere
 New Mexico, New South Wales, Australia
Nuevo México, Chiriquí, Panama

Ships
, several ships of the US Navy 
, the lead ship of the New Mexico-class battleships
s
, a Virginia-class submarine under construction

Other
New Mexico (film), a 1951 American film directed by Irving Reis
New Mexico chile, a cultivar group
New Mexico music, a music genre
University of New Mexico, a public university in Albuquerque
New Mexico Lobos, the athletic program of the above institution
New Mexico State University, a public university in Las Cruces, New Mexico
New Mexico State Aggies, the athletic program of the above institution

See also

Old Mexico (disambiguation)
New Mexican (disambiguation)
Mexico (disambiguation)
State of Mexico, also known as Old Mexico (Spanish: Viejo México)